Le Coutances is a French double-cream cow's milk cheese from the town of Coutances. It has a thin, bloomy rind and a rich, intense flavour. It is produced by the French food company Bongrain and comes in 200-gram cylinders of 7.5 cm diameter and 4.5 cm thickness.

Notes

French cheeses
Cow's-milk cheeses
Norman cuisine